Thumb Fun is a 1952 Warner Bros. Looney Tunes short directed by Robert McKimson. The cartoon was released on March 1, 1952, and stars Daffy Duck and Porky Pig. Mel Blanc provided the voices for both of the characters.

Plot
Daffy scoffs at a flock of ducks flying south as he decides to hitchhike his way south. Not having any luck so far, Daffy paints what appears to be an excavation hole in the road. Porky arrives in his red sports car and stops in front of the "hole". Daffy is delighted that Porky is driving to Miami. He gathers his luggage and finally manages to stuff it in the trunk; Porky is astounded that Daffy stuffed all that luggage in his tiny trunk and opens it, causing the luggage to launch him away and leaving Daffy upset since he has to pack again.

Porky and Daffy are driving along the road when a tiny yellow car starts sounding its horn and tailgating their car. Daffy jerks the steering wheel and car, not letting the small car pass until Daffy slams on the brakes and the tiny car collides with their rear bumper. Daffy challenges the driver, who reveals himself as a giant of a man, prompting Daffy to behave like a friendly dog. The man ignores Daffy and pummels Porky with a pile driver punch that sends Porky's head through the radiator cap of his car.

Porky and Daffy continue driving. Daffy wants to drive faster and forces Porky's foot down the accelerator pedal despite Porky's protests. Immediately, a cop on a motorcycle pursues and catches up with them. However, after a prank from Daffy leading the cop to being flung by the luggage in the trunk, they are brought to the police station.

Daffy is waiting outside the police station in the next town when Porky comes out, happy that he was fined only $2. Daffy, outraged, pushes his luck and leads Porky to an additional fine of $50. Porky says he tried to tell Daffy. Angered by Daffy's antics, Porky plots revenge. He buys and gives Daffy a gift, but tells him not to open it as he quickly puts it in the trunk. Daffy, not being able to stand the suspense, opens the trunk, making his luggage fly out and launch Daffy away. Porky snickers evilly and speeds off. Daffy opens his gift and finds that it is an (American Automobile Association-approved) Acme Hitchhiker's Thumb, which he vainly tries to use all winter for a ride. Daffy ends the cartoon by adding, "Owwwww, my aching thumb."

References

External links
 
 

1952 animated films
1952 short films
1952 films
1950s Warner Bros. animated short films
Looney Tunes shorts
Warner Bros. Cartoons animated short films
Films directed by Robert McKimson
Daffy Duck films
Porky Pig films
Films scored by Carl Stalling
1950s English-language films
Films about hitchhiking